Serghei Nicolau (born Sergey Nikonov; 1905–1999) was a Romanian communist espionage chief and a Securitate general.

Biography 
An ethnic Russian, Nicolau was born in Cacica, Suceava County in to an ethnic Russian family.  He also called himself at various times Serghei Nicanov, or Sergiu Nicolau, or Victor Nicolau-Cacica. 

Like his boss Emil Bodnăraș, he was recruited by the NKVD. This occurred in the late 1930s after he was expelled from the Chemistry faculty of the University of Iași, for attending meetings of the banned Romanian Communist Party (PCR). His studies abroad, in Brussels and Marseille, were paid for, and in the latter city, he was part of the local French Communist Party leadership. At some point, he deserted from the Romanian Army and left for the Soviet Union.

At the beginning of World War II, Nicolau was assigned to return to Romania in order to set up a spy network, but he was captured at sent to prison, where he spent part of his sentence alongside another NKVD agent, Gheorghe Pintilie. While at Doftana prison, the two belonged to a group of Soviet agents around future PCR leader Gheorghe Gheorghiu-Dej. Following the 1949 arrest of N. D. Stănescu, he was made head of the External Intelligence Service (SSI). Guided by Bodnăraș, he worked to recruit loyal agents, both within the agency and in the Romanian Army. In consultation with the local Soviet espionage bureau, the pair reorganized the SSI into four bureaus: foreign information, supervision of diplomatic missions in Bucharest, domestic information and counterespionage activities. 

The Soviet handlers were not content with only training and assisting  Securitate officers, but they actively started recruiting some of them. Nicolau protested this practice to Gheorghiu-Dej, who refused to intervene, since he was seeking at the time the support of the Soviets in his campaign against the Ana Pauker faction of the PCR. On April 1 of that year, Nicolau transferred to the information services of the Ministry of Defense. From 1954 until his retirement in 1960, Nicolau, who held the rank of lieutenant general, led the military espionage bureau of the Romanian General Staff.

In the early 1950s, his wife Nina was Gheorgiu-Dej's personal secretary.

Notes

Bibliography

1905 births
1999 deaths
Romanian communists
Directors of the Foreign Intelligence Service (Romania)
Soviet spies
Securitate generals
People convicted of spying for the Soviet Union
Prisoners and detainees of Romania
Romanian prisoners and detainees
People from Suceava County
Incarcerated spies
Collaborators with the Soviet Union